Kincaid-Anderson House, also known as Fairfield, is a historic home located near Jenkinsville, Fairfield County, South Carolina.  It was built about 1774, and is a two-story, brick Georgian style dwelling.  It has a hipped roof and sits on a fieldstone foundation. It has small brick side wings that were added in a 1920s restoration. Also on the property is a two-story brick and frame work house that has been converted into a guesthouse. It was the home of James Kincaid, who was one of the first purchasers of cotton in the South Carolina upcountry and was possibly involved in the early development of a cotton gin.

It was added to the National Register of Historic Places in 1974.

References

Houses on the National Register of Historic Places in South Carolina
Georgian architecture in South Carolina
Houses completed in 1774
Houses in Fairfield County, South Carolina
National Register of Historic Places in Fairfield County, South Carolina